Sapporo is a Japanese city.

Sapporo may also refer to:
Sapporo Breweries
Sapporo Station